Zaorski is a Polish surname. Notable people with this name include:

 Andrzej Zaorski (born 1942), Polish actor and cabaret artist
 Jan Zaorski (1887–1956), Polish surgeon and hospital director
 Janusz Zaorski (born 1947), Polish film director, screenwriter and actor, the brother of Andrzej
 Linnzi Zaorski (born 1978), American jazz singer and songwriter

Polish-language surnames